Articles (arranged alphabetically) related to Lesotho include:



0-9

A

B 
 Basutoland

C 
 Communications in Lesotho
 Culture of Lesotho

D 
 Demographics of Lesotho
 Districts of Lesotho

E 
 Economy of Lesotho
 Education in Lesotho

F 
 Foreign relations of Lesotho

G 
 Geography of Lesotho

H

I 
 Islam in Lesotho

J 
Joels Drift

K

L 
 Lesotho
 Lesotho Highlands Water Project
 LGBT rights in Lesotho (Gay rights)
 Liphofung Historical Site
 List of airports in Lesotho
 List of cities in Lesotho
 Lesotho Cycling Association (Federation)
 List of reptiles of Lesotho

M 
 Maseru the capital city
 Military of Lesotho
 Morija Museum & Archives
 Music of Lesotho

N 
 National University of Lesotho

O 
 Outline of Lesotho

P 
 Politics of Lesotho
 Pontso S.M. Sekatle
 Postage stamps and postal history of Lesotho

Q

R

S 
Sefikeng

T 
 Telecom Lesotho
 Thomas Mofolo (1876–1948)
 Transport in Lesotho

U 
United States Ambassador to Lesotho

V

W

X

Y

Z

See also

Lists of country-related topics - similar lists for other countries

 
Lesotho